Ceinture (French, 'belt' or 'girdle', and may refer to a ring road) may refer to:

Petite ceinture
 Chemin de fer de Petite Ceinture, a former circular railway in Paris
 Small Ring, Brussels, the inner ringroad

Grande ceinture
 Grande Ceinture line, a railway line around Paris
 Greater Ring, Brussels, the intermediate ringroad

See also

  Ceintures de Lyon, a former series of fortifications around Lyon, France
  Ceinture fléchée, a French-Canadian colourful sash
  Ceinture noire, a 2018 album by Gims
  Ceinture rouge, communes of the Île-de-France formerly dominated by the French Communist Party